The 2002 Women's Hockey Champions Challenge was the inaugural edition of the field hockey championship for women. It was held in Johannesburg, South Africa from February 9–17, 2002.


Squads

Results

Group stage

Fixtures

Classification

Fifth and sixth place

Third and fourth place

Final

Statistics

Final standings

References

External links
Official website

Champions Challenge
Hockey Champions Challenge
International women's field hockey competitions hosted by South Africa
Women's Hockey Champions Challenge I
Sports competitions in Johannesburg
2000s in Johannesburg
Hockey Champions Challenge